Navahopus is an ichnogenus of dinosaur footprint that was made by an indeterminate navahopodid sauropodomorph once thought to have been a prosauropod that was alive during the Early Jurassic in southwestern United States. Two ichnospecies are known: the type ichnospecies, N. falcipollex (named in 1980) and a second species, N. coyoteensis (named in 2008). It is known from the Early Jurassic of Arizona (Aztec Sandstone and Navajo Sandstone), California (Aztec Sandstone) and Utah.

See also

 List of dinosaur ichnogenera

References

Fossil taxa described in 1980
Dinosaur trace fossils
Sauropodomorphs